The 2015 Asian Women's U23 Volleyball Championship was held on 1 to 9 May 2015 in Pasig, Philippines. It was the inaugural edition of the tournament. The tournament served as the Asian qualifiers for the 2015 FIVB Volleyball Women's U23 World Championship held in Ankara, Turkey which the top two ranked teams qualified for the world championship. China won the tournament and Liu Yanhan was the most valuable player.

The tournament was organized by the Asian Volleyball Confederation, in association with Larong Volleyball sa Pilipinas, Inc. (LVPI), the newly formed national federation for volleyball in the Philippines.

Venue

Pools composition

2015 Asian Women's U23 Volleyball Championship Squads List

Squads

Pool standing procedure
 Numbers of matches won
 Match points
 Sets ratio
 Points ratio
 Result of the last match between the tied teams

Match won 3–0 or 3–1: 3 match points for the winner, 0 match points for the loser
Match won 3–2: 2 match points for the winner, 1 match point for the loser

Preliminary round
All times are Philippines Standard Time (UTC+08:00).

Pool A

|}

|}

Pool B

|}

|}

Pool C

|}

|}

Pool D

|}

|}

Second round
  The results and the points of the matches between the same teams that were already played during the preliminary round shall be taken into account for the classification round.

Pool E

|}

|}

Pool F

|}

|}

Classification round

Classification 9th–12th

Semifinals

|}

11th place

|}

9th place

|}

Final round

Quarterfinals

|}

5th–8th semifinals

|}

Semifinals

|}

7th place

|}

5th place

|}

3rd place

|}

Final

|}

Final standing

Awards

Most Valuable Player
 Liu Yanhan
Best Outside Spikers
 Lee So-young
 Liu Yanhan
Best Setter
 Chen Xintong

Best Opposite Spiker
 Pimpichaya Kokram
Best Middle Blockers
 Hattaya Bamrungsuk
 Zheng Yixin
Best Libero
 Kim Yeon-gyeon

Broadcast partners
Sports5 (AksyonTV)

See also
 2015 Asian Men's U23 Volleyball Championship

References

U23, 2015
2015 in women's volleyball
2015 in Philippine women's sport
Volleyball in the Philippines
International volleyball competitions hosted by the Philippines